Rushin' Ballet is a 1937 Our Gang short comedy film directed by Gordon Douglas. It was the 154th Our Gang short (155th episode, 66th talking short, and 67th talking episode) that was released.

Cast

The Gang
 Eugene Lee as Porky
 George McFarland as Spanky
 Carl Switzer as Alfalfa
 Billie Thomas as Buckwheat

Additional cast
 Tommy Bond as Butch
 Sidney Kibrick as Woim
 Darla Hood as Dancer
 Darwood Kaye as Boy dancer
 Harold Switzer as Boy dancer
 Gloria Brown as Ballet dancer
 Elaine Merk as Ballet dancer
 Camille Williams as Ballet dancer
 Kathryn Sheldon as Harried dance recital teacher
 Maria Ayres as Bit role
 Fred Holmes as Audience extra
 John Collum as Boy in audience

See also
 Our Gang filmography

References

External links

1937 films
1937 comedy films
1937 short films
American black-and-white films
Films directed by Gordon Douglas
Metro-Goldwyn-Mayer short films
Our Gang films
1930s American films